Worawut Namvech (born 4 July 1995) is a Thai professional footballer who plays as a centre back for Thai League club Port and the Thailand national team.

International career
In August 2017, he won the Football at the 2017 Southeast Asian Games with Thailand U23. 

On 12 April 2021, He was named in manager Akira Nishino’s 47-man squad for Thailand’s 2022 World Cup qualification he play the friendly matches against Tajikistan.

International Goals

U23

U21

Honours

International
Thailand U-23
 Sea Games  Gold Medal (1); 2017
 Dubai Cup (1) :  2017
Thailand U-21
 Nations Cup (1): 2016

Club
Chiangrai United
 Thailand Champions Cup (1): 2018

External links
 

1996 births
Living people
Worawut Namvech
Association football central defenders
Worawut Namvech
Worawut Namvech
Worawut Namvech
Worawut Namvech
Worawut Namvech
Southeast Asian Games medalists in football
Footballers at the 2018 Asian Games
Competitors at the 2017 Southeast Asian Games
Worawut Namvech
Worawut Namvech